The Ulster Hospital, commonly known as the Ulster, is a teaching hospital in Dundonald (at the eastern edge of Belfast) in County Down, Northern Ireland. It is within the townland of Ballyregan, beside the A20 road. It provides acute services in the North Down, Ards and Castlereagh council areas, as well as east Belfast. It is managed by the South Eastern Health and Social Care Trust.

History
The hospital was first founded as the Ulster Hospital for Women and Sick Children in 1872. It was initially located on Chichester Street in Belfast City Centre but moved to Templemore Avenue in Mountpottinger in 1892.

The first X-ray machine at the hospital was installed in 1920 and Dr Beath was employed to operate it.

While located in Mountpottinger the hospital was severely damaged in the Belfast Blitz in 1941. In 1962 it was relocated to Dundonald and renamed the Ulster Hospital.

A refurbishment programme, announced in 2001, included a renal unit (completed in 2006), a maternity unit (completed in 2007), a multistorey car park (completed in 2007) and a critical care complex accommodating theatres, laboratories and a sterile services department (completed in 2010).

In February 2003 the hospital was designated as one of the nine acute hospitals in the acute hospital network of Northern Ireland on which healthcare would be focused under the government health policy 'Developing Better Services'.

In June 2011, the Ulster Hospital was granted University Teaching Hospital status by Queen's University Belfast, and an undergraduate sub-deanery was created within the Trust.

A new inpatient ward block was completed in April 2017.

References

External links

South Eastern Health and Social Care Trust
1872 establishments in Ireland
Hospitals in Belfast
Health and Social Care (Northern Ireland) hospitals
Hospital buildings completed in 1962
Hospitals established in 1872
Teaching hospitals in Northern Ireland
Hospitals in County Down